Earl N. Merkman (April 27, 1962 - November 18, 1988) was the youngest commissioner in the Netherlands Antilles (26 years).

Earl was the eldest son of Ruford Merkman and Claristine Eunicy Merkman-Liburd, born on Sint Eustatius.

Earl Merkman had 6 brothers and 3 sisters. His brothers are Reuben Merkman, Maurits Merkman, Calvin Merkman, Selvyn Merkman, Oswin Merkman and Rignaldo Merkman. His sisters are Edris Merkman, Beulah Merkman and Javanca Merkman.

References

1961 births
1988 deaths